Duopalatinus emarginatus, is a species of demersal catfish of the family Pimelodidae that is native to São Francisco River basin of Brazil.

References

Pimelodidae
Catfish of South America
Fish of the São Francisco River basin
Fish described in 1840